The 1903 Harvard Crimson football team represented Harvard University in the 1903 college football season. The Crimson finished with a 9–3 record under first-year head coach John Cranston.  Walter Camp selected two Harvard players as first-team selections to his 1903 College Football All-America Team. They were tackle Daniel Knowlton and guard Andrew Marshall.

The 1903 season was also notable for the opening of Harvard Stadium, which hosted its first game on November 14 against Dartmouth.

Schedule

References

Harvard
Harvard Crimson football seasons
Harvard Crimson football
1900s in Boston